The Chevrolet Cobalt SS comprises three sport compact versions of the Chevrolet Cobalt that were built on the General Motors Delta platform at Lordstown Assembly in Ohio, United States. The three versions included two forced induction inline-four Ecotec engines and a third naturally aspirated engine that was later called the Cobalt Sport. SS is an abbreviation of Super Sport, a historic moniker used by Chevrolet to denote high performance upgrades that meet certain criteria.

The Cobalt SS was GM's first foray into the tuner market, launching as a  supercharged 2.0 L coupe in late 2004, paired only with the F35 5-speed manual transmission of Opel. The following year, a naturally aspirated 1SS model equipped with GM's new 2.4 L  engine was added in both coupe and sedan body styles, including automatic and manual transmission options. Production of the supercharged coupe continued until 2007, and after a brief hiatus the SS relaunched in the second quarter of 2008 with a more efficient and powerful turbocharged 2.0 L engine producing  before all Cobalt production ended in 2010. (See timeline).

The Cobalt SS received generally positive reviews, particularly the turbocharged and supercharged versions. In a 2013 review, journalist Patrick George called it the best compact car ever made by General Motors, and a potential "future classic". At first release in 2004, the supercharged version was praised for its performance but drew criticism for its interior quality and exterior styling, both described as too reminiscent of its predecessor, the Cavalier. Reports surfaced in May 2009 that General Motors planned to eliminate the Cobalt SS as early as December 2009, but they proved to be untrue. Production continued but ordering options for late 2010 models were limited and production of all Cobalts ended in June 2009. The car was replaced by the Cruze, but a high performance version comparable to the Cobalt SS was never built and the Cruze ended production for the North American market in 2019.

Model details

Overview
General Motors used five different inline-four engines in the Cobalt over the course of production, and designated three as SS models.  The first was launched in 2004 as a 2005 model with a new powertrain that had debuted one year earlier on the Saturn ION Red Line. It was available as a Supercharged coupe only. The naturally aspirated 2.4 L LE5 engine was the next SS to launch in late 2005 as a 2006 model, available as both a coupe and sedan for the duration of its run. However, in late 2007, at the same time the announcement cancelling the SS Supercharged was made, GM also announced that the 2.4 L would be renamed "Cobalt Sport", rendering Chevrolet without a Cobalt SS for the first half of the 2008 model year. The 2.0 L LNF turbocharged Cobalt was the last to launch in the second quarter of 2008.  It was initially available only as a coupe until a sedan option was offered for the 2009 model year but again deleted for 2010 after less than 500 were produced.

All three models of the Cobalt SS feature four wheel, anti-lock disc brakes. Compared to the base Cobalt, the SS has lower front and rear fascias for a more aggressive look with integrated fog lights, side rocker moldings, interior accents, and a chrome exhaust tip. Exclusive to the 2.0 L Cobalt are a titanium‑faced sport analogue cluster with a 160 mph (260 km/h in Canada) speedometer, an A‑pillar mounted boost gauge, reclining front bucket seats with two‑tone leather‑appointed seating surfaces, vertical adjusting head restraints and driver‑side lumbar and height adjusters, and a sport‑tuned FE5 suspension with a 24 mm front stabilizer bar and 22 mm rear stabilizer bar.

SS Supercharged

Available as a coupe only, the SS Supercharged featured the 2.0 L LSJ Ecotec engine with an Eaton M62 Roots type supercharger and air‑to‑liquid intercooler. Optional for the LSJ was a performance package coded G85 that added Recaro bucket seats and a limited slip differential (LSD). The G85 option continued in the LNF Cobalt, but added only the LSD. The car became notable for a high‑profile spoiler that was standard in 2005, but optional from 2008 when a lower profile spoiler used on all other Cobalt coupes became an option.

GM offered dealer-installed performance upgrade packages called "stage kits" that were covered by factory warranty.
The Stage 1 kit consists of new fuel injectors and a reprogram of the ECU, and yields up to a  improvement. Both  kits increase the engine redline to 7,000 rpm. The Stage 3 kit consists of a smaller,  supercharger pulley, a 2‑pass intercooler end plate and a customizable replacement ECU. The Stage 3 ECU allows for the use of a 50‑shot of nitrous, 100 octane fuel and an adjustable redline from 6,750 to 8,000 rpm. Stage 3 produces  using 93 octane fuel, up  using 100 octane fuel, and much higher power with nitrous. Stage 3 is for track use only, and to emphasize this, air conditioning is disabled with the Stage 3 ECU.

Wheel hop, wheelspin, and a general lack of traction were problems frequently encountered with the supercharged Cobalt due to its front drive setup and relatively high torque. Upgraded front and rear trans and motor mounts would help to alleviate these issues. The GM Performance Division later tried to rectify these problems in the turbocharged car by providing wider, stickier tires and stronger axles.

SS Turbocharged

The LSJ engine did not meet emissions requirements for the 2008 model year, and General Motors' contract with Eaton had expired. The non-supercharged 2.4 L Cobalt SS also lost its Super Sport designation for the 2008 model year and was renamed "Sport", leaving no SS in production. However, in fall 2007, a more powerful Cobalt SS was announced for the second quarter of 2008. The engine had been introduced in a rear wheel drive application for the 2007 GM Kappa platform, which includes the Saturn Sky, Pontiac Solstice, and Opel GT.

Also new for the 2008 SS were SS-embroidered sport seats with suede-like UltraLux inserts, several new exterior colors, and wider  forged, split-spoke wheels with P225/40R18 Continental AG tires, styled similarly to those offered for the Chevrolet Corvette C6. The car's electronics were also new, and along with greater assist in poor traction conditions, a "no-lift-shift" feature was added which allows the driver to maintain turbocharger boost during shifts to a higher gear. During a no‑lift‑shift, the driver begins the shift normally by depressing the clutch, but the accelerator pedal is held wide open while the shift is completed. Also new was "launch control", which feathers the throttle at roughly 4,800 rpm until engagement of the clutch, allowing more consistent launches in competitive situations. To activate launch control, the driver presses twice on the traction control button which first turns off traction control, and then notifies the driver through the Driver's Information Center that Competitive Mode is active and launch control is ready for use. Turbocharged Cobalt owners have found that better times can be achieved while racing when the car is manually launched. GM had previously offered a turbocharged four cylinder with front wheel drive in the 1986-1990 Pontiac Sunbird GT and the Buick Skyhawk T-Type from 1986-1988.

New for 2009 was the aforementioned four-door sedan option, as well as an optional "reconfigurable performance display" (RPD) for the coupe only. The $295 option replaced the boost gauge in the A‑pillar, and allows the driver to manipulate traction control, stability control, "shift points", and the engagement of Competition Mode, as well as information regarding the car's engine torque and horsepower, g‑force, boost, wideband air fuel ratio, barometric pressure, temperature, and battery voltage. For 2010, the RPD and a power sunroof were standard. The red/ebony and grey/ebony interior color options were also dropped, as was the turbocharged sedan.

The kit can be installed by the owner of the car, but final alteration of the vehicle's engine control unit must take place at a GM dealer.

SS Naturally aspirated
Chevrolet introduced a naturally aspirated Cobalt SS in the fall of 2005 as a 2006 model, available as both a coupe and sedan. The LE5 engine was paired with a 5-speed manual (or optionally the 4T45 4‑speed automatic)  for 2006 and was introduced on both the FWD Delta platform and RWD Kappa platform. For the 2006 and 2007 model years the car was called SS, or "1SS", but was replaced with the moniker "Cobalt Sport" for 2008 with the anticipated introduction of the turbocharged SS; it is the Getrag F23 transmission with different ratios from the F35 in the forced induction cars, and is the same transmission that Chevrolet mated to the 2.2 L L61 engine in the Cobalt LS and LT.

Other changes over the supercharged car are notable but not drastic; 17‑inch broad spoke wheels with narrower P205/50R17 all‑season Pirelli tires were standard, as was the low profile spoiler. 2.4 L and 2.2 L Sport Package Cobalts have a 140 mph (220 km/h in Canada) speedometer with optional white face gauges. The car rides on the FE3 suspension, superior and more sport‑tuned to that of base Cobalts but less refined than the FE5 on the supercharged and turbocharged cars. Brakes on the 2.4  L naturally aspirated and supercharged model are identical, but the turbocharged model received an upgraded Brembo braking system. The front and rear bumpers are the same, but the front lacks a lip accessory and the bottom of the rear fascia is slightly different. With the exception of exterior styling and some interior trims, the vehicle is identical to the Pontiac G5 GT.

Reception

Reviews of the supercharged Cobalt SS were generally positive. While the Cavalier received very negative reviews, the supercharged Cobalt was seen as an improvement, and a worthy first entry for GM into the tuner market. However, the general fit and finish was poor, and power levels were not up to par with other competitors. Journalist Thom Blackett said, "When compared with more contemporary cars including the Dodge Neon SRT-4 and the Subaru WRX, that SS badge seems to lose some of its luster." The F35 transmission has also been deemed inferior to that in the newest of generation of Honda's Civic Si. Critics also disliked the heavy wheels which negatively affected handling, as well as the spoiler which obstructed rearward visibility. Speaking of the high‑profile aero wing, automotive journalist Alexandra Straub said, "the deck-lid spoiler was directly in my line-of-sight when looking out of the rearview mirror. It's almost like it cut everything in half."  In his review of a later model, John Neff of Autoblog called the wing "obnoxious".  Some Cobalt SS owners have traded spoilers with lower trim owners to obtain a less aggressive look, or traded the entire trunklid with Cobalt LS owners, for whom a rear spoiler is merely optional. The naturally aspirated Cobalt SS has been seen as an improvement over the base models with its slightly more potent 2.4 L engine, but notably inferior to the supercharged car.

The powertrain of the 2008 turbocharged Cobalt SS received rave reviews. John Neff of Autoblog said, "The GM Performance Division completely reworked the Cobalt SS for 2008, swapping in a more powerful turbocharged engine, upgrading the rest of the mechanicals, and tweaking the entire package on the world's most demanding race tracks, including the famed Nürburgring in Germany. The result is – and we're not kidding here – the most impressive performance car to wear a bow-tie badge on sale today." Journalists were impressed with the performance of the car in relation to the price; Neff added that the "2009 Cobalt SS Turbo is freakishly good at going fast and the best bang for the buck value below $30,000." Ron Kiino of Motor Trend said, "at only $22,995, the SS could stand for Super Steal." The MSRP was raised to $24,095 for the 2009 model year.

The Nürburgring‑tuned suspension gives the Cobalt SS some of the best handling characteristics of any General Motors front wheel drive vehicle, and the suspension is stiffer and more refined than the supercharged car. Since the interior is hardly changed other than the seats, those criticisms remain. Of the interior in the turbocharged sedan, Car and Driver said it "is constructed primarily of plastics cheap enough to be rejected from a Chinese toy factory; the Tata Nano probably has a fancier parking-brake lever." The new Cobalt was the winner in its price class (under $30,000) of Car and Driver's 2008 Lightning Lap competition at Virginia International Raceway, beating lap times of several cars in the $30,000-$60,000 class including the Mitsubishi Lancer Evolution X. It held the front-wheel drive record until it was surpassed by the Honda Civic Type R in 2018. Four Chevrolet Cobalt SS cars were used in the Continental Challenge Street Tuner class in 2009.

See also
Chevrolet Cobalt
GM Performance Division

References

External links
2008 Cobalt SS - GM promotional video
2010 Cobalt SS Turbocharged review
2008 Cobalt SS launch control demonstration

Cobalt SS
Front-wheel-drive sports cars
Sport compact cars
Coupés
Sports sedans
Cars introduced in 2004
Motor vehicles manufactured in the United States